Boliche (pronounced [bo'litʃe], also called boliche mechado) is a pot roast dish from Cuban cuisine consisting of eye round beef roast stuffed with ham. The stuffed roast is browned in olive oil simmered in water with onions until the meat is soft, and then quartered potatoes added. Additional ingredients can include green peppers and various spices such as coriander, oregano and bay leaf, and salt and pepper. During the cooking process, the flavors of the ham and beef intermingle, and the ham can serve to baste the interior of the beef. 

Boliche is usually served with white rice, black beans and fried sweet plantains. Other cuts of beef can also be used to prepare the dish, such as beef tenderloin.

See also

 List of sausage dishes
 List of stuffed dishes

Notes

References

Cuban cuisine
Stuffed dishes
Beef dishes
Ham dishes